Jacob Hopper (born 6 February 1997) is a professional Australian rules footballer for the Richmond Football Club in the Australian Football League (AFL), having previously played for .

Early life
Hopper was born in New South Wales and grew up in the small Riverina town of Leeton. He began playing football at the age of four with the Leeton-Whitton Crows where his father coached. He joined Greater Western Sydney's academy program at the age of 13 and regularly gained selection for NSW representative teams in the years that followed. He attended school at St Francis de Sales Regional College. At the age of 17, he began boarding at St Patrick's College, Ballarat while playing TAC Cup football for the North Ballarat Rebels.

He was recruited by the Greater Western Sydney Giants with the seventh overall selection in the 2015 national draft.

AFL career
Hopper made his debut in round 8 of the 2016 AFL season, in a 91-point win against  at Spotless Stadium. He was rewarded with a nomination for the 2016 AFL Rising Star, after he collected 32 disposals equaling the AFL record (since 1992) for most disposals made on debut (Brisbane Lion Bradd Dalziell's 32 in 2008 the previous highest). and nine clearances.

He was traded on 11 October.

Statistics
Statistics are correct to the end of Round 23 2022

|- style="background-color: #EAEAEA"
! scope="row" style="text-align:center" | 2016 
|  || 2 || 10 || 5 || 3 || 65 || 107 || 172 || 32 || 33 || 0.5 || 0.3 || 6.5 || 10.7 || 17.2 || 3.2 || 3.3 || 0 
|-
! scope="row" style="text-align:center" | 2017 
|  || 2 || 13 || 4 || 4 || 89 || 133 || 222 || 35 || 73 || 0.3 || 0.3 || 6.9 || 10.2 || 17.1 || 2.7 || 5.6 || 0 
|-style="background-color: #EAEAEA"
! scope="row" style="text-align:center" | 2018 
|  || 2 || 21 || 10 || 14 || 214 || 227 || 441 || 55 || 98 || 0.5 || 0.7 || 10.2 || 10.8 || 21.0 || 2.6 || 4.7 || 0
|-
! scope=row style="text-align:center" | 2019 
|  || 2 || 23 || 10 || 11 || 303 || 296 || 599 || 73 || 95 || 0.4 || 0.5 || 13.2 || 12.9 || 26.0 || 3.2 || 4.1 || 1
|- style=background:#EAEAEA
! scope=row style="text-align:center"  | 2020 
|  || 2 || 17 || 1 || 7 || 159 || 168 || 327 || 40 || 71 || 0.1 || 0.4 || 9.4 || 9.9 || 19.2 || 2.4 || 4.2 || 4
|-
! scope=row style="text-align:center" | 2021 
|  || 2 || 23 || 10 || 7 || 311 || 296 || 607 || 72 || 88 || 0.4 || 0.3 || 13.5 || 12.9 || 26.4 || 3.1 || 3.8 || 15
|-
|-style="background-color: #EAEAEA"
! scope="row" style="text-align:center" | 2022 
|  || 2 || 7 || 2 || 1 || 57 || 78 || 135 || 20 || 21 || 0.2 || 0.1 || 8.1 || 11.1 || 19.2 || 2.8 || 3.0 || 0
|-
|- class=sortbottom
! colspan=3 | Career
! 114 !! 42 !! 47 !! 1198 !! 1305 !! 2503 !! 327 !! 479 !! 0.3 !! 0.4 !! 10.5 !! 11.4 !! 21.9 !! 2.8 !! 4.2 !! 20
|}

Notes

Honours and achievements
 Greater Western Sydney Giants Academy Player Of The Year: 2015
 2016 AFL Rising Star: nominee
 Greater Western Sydney Giants Rising Star: 2016
 Brett Kirk Medal: 2019

References

External links

1997 births
Living people
Australian rules footballers from Victoria (Australia)
Greater Western Sydney Giants players
Greater Western Victoria Rebels players
People educated at St Patrick's College, Ballarat